Katokopia Stadium is a multi-use stadium in Peristerona, Cyprus.  It is currently used mostly for football matches and is the home ground of Doxa Katokopia of the Cypriot First Division. The stadium was renovated in 2022 and holds 3,500 people.

External links
Stadium information

 

Football venues in Cyprus
Buildings and structures in Nicosia District